The E. J. Jecker House at 201 N. Wheeler in Victoria, Texas, United States, was built in 1910.  It was a work of architects Praeger & Hull and of building contractor Bailey Mills.  It was listed on the National Register of Historic Places in 1986.

It is an L-plan residence with Ionic columns on the first-floor level of its two-story wrap-around porch.

It was a home of one of the 2,124 German-speaking immigrants from Alsace-Lorraine brought to Texas by Henri Castro in the 1840s.

It was listed on the NRHP as part of a study which listed numerous historic resources in the Victoria area.

See also

National Register of Historic Places listings in Victoria County, Texas

References

Houses completed in 1910
Houses in Victoria, Texas
Houses on the National Register of Historic Places in Texas
Neoclassical architecture in Texas
National Register of Historic Places in Victoria, Texas